Season of the Assassin is the debut solo album by Jedi Mind Tricks frontman/Army of the Pharaohs leader Vinnie Paz. The album was originally called Assassin's Creed.

Critical response

The album received positive reviews from critics.

RapReviews - "Vinnie Paz is one of the angriest men in rap. He's been snarling and swearing his way through songs as the frontman of Jedi Mind Tricks for 15 years."
HipHopDX - "The album is an exciting break from the usual JMT formula, with Paz hitting his stride as a lyricist and showing a different and more rounded side to his craft."

Track listing

Notes
 The single "Same Story (My Dedication)" was originally produced by Anno Domini Nation, but it has been changed on the album because of a problem clearing the sample from "Winter Song" by Sara Bareilles.
 The album was reissued on August 28, 2020 celebrating its 10th anniversary in limited edition cassette tape and was released digitally as well, it contained 6 remixed songs.

Album singles

Charts

References

2010 debut albums
Babygrande Records albums
Enemy Soil Records albums
Albums produced by DJ Muggs
Albums produced by Lord Finesse
Albums produced by Da Beatminerz
Albums produced by Madlib
Albums produced by MoSS
Albums produced by Bronze Nazareth
Albums produced by 4th Disciple
Horrorcore albums
Vinnie Paz albums
Political hip hop albums